The Kanggye Line is an electrified narrow-gauge line of the Korean State Railway in North Korea running from Kanggye on the Manp'o Line to Rangrim, primarily hauling forest products.  An interesting feature of the line is a significant switchback west of Rangrim.

History
The Kanggye Line was built by the Korean State Railway in the late 1940s to aid in the construction of a hydroelectric dam on the Changjin River in the Rangrim mountains; construction of the dam had been started by the Japanese in 1937. Following an order issued in September 1999 by Kim Jong-il, electrification of the line at 1500 V DC was completed on 5 October 2000.

Route

A yellow background in the "Distance" box indicates that section of the line is not electrified; a pink background indicates that section is  narrow gauge; an orange background indicates that section is non-electrified narrow gauge.

References

Railway lines in North Korea
2 ft 6 in gauge railways in North Korea
Railways with Zig Zags